Ding (also called Di or Dzing) is a Bantu language that is spoken in the Democratic Republic of Congo.

Maho (2009) considers the following to be distinct languages closely related to Ding:
 B861 Ngul (Ngwi), B862 Lwel (Kelwer), B863 Mpiin (Pindi), B864 West Ngongo, B865 Nzadi
(See Boma–Dzing languages.) 

Only Ngul, which includes Ngwi, has an ISO code.

References

Boma-Dzing languages
Languages of the Democratic Republic of the Congo